Panezai ancestry belongs from Haroon khel and Sanatia, Kakar. The blend of two words Pashto words "Pane" and "zoi" son of Haroon Khel. Generally, Pani (the organizer of Panezai clan) had two children first's name was "Khano" and seconds name was "Balo". It is said that they were roaming shepherds and with section of time, to satisfy the necessities of life they received cultivating as an occupation. These two siblings are said to establish Panezai clan. As the sub-cast of Kakar, Panezai has a place with Pashtun country. Panezai clan among Snatia, who live in Khanozai,Balozai, Bostan,Gwal Killasaifullah, Rode Malazai, Muslim bagh, Gulistan, Ziarat, Ajram, Gulistan, India Uttar Pradesh, Afghanistan Kandahar, Quetta and Harnai. According to survey there are 52 villages of Panezai clan in Indian province Uttar Pradesh district Saharanpur. 
A book has published by author Bakht Muhammad Khan on sanatia Kakar (Panezai shajara). Book Name: (Insaab Naama Qaam Panezai Sanatiya Kakar).

People with the name Panezai include:
 Noor Jehan Panezai
 Naseema Hafeez Panezai
 Aslam Khan Panezai.